This is a list of schools in Austria.

COLE International Schools Innsbruck
Akademisches Gymnasium Innsbruck
Akademisches Gymnasium (Vienna)
American International School-Salzburg
American International School of Vienna
BRG Klagenfurt-Viktring
Danube International School
Europagymnasium Auhof
Francisco Josephinum
Graz International Bilingual School
GRG 12 Erlgasse
Gymnasium Wasagasse
International Christian School of Vienna
Japanische Schule in Wien
Kollegium Kalksburg
Linz International School Auhof
Lycée Français de Vienne
Petrinum Linz
St. Gilgen International School
Schottengymnasium
Stiftsgymnasium Melk
Stilklassen
Vienna International School

See also

Education in Austria
List of universities in Austria
List of libraries in Austria

 
Austria
Austria
Schools
Schools
Schools